Ilya Yevgenyevich Golosov (born 9 August 2001) is a Russian football player. He plays for FC Kuban Krasnodar on loan from FC Spartak Moscow.

Club career
He made his debut in the Russian Football National League for FC Spartak-2 Moscow on 9 March 2020 in a game against FC Tekstilshchik Ivanovo. He started the game and was substituted at half-time.

He made his Russian Premier League debut for FC Spartak Moscow on 27 June 2020 in a game against FC Ufa, replacing Andrey Yeshchenko in the 84th minute.

On 22 July 2021, he joined FC Rotor Volgograd on loan for the 2021–22 season.

On 28 June 2022, Golosov was loaned to FC Kuban Krasnodar for the 2022–23 season.

References

External links
 Profile by Russian Football National League
 
 

2001 births
Sportspeople from Rostov-on-Don
Living people
Russian footballers
Association football defenders
FC Lokomotiv Moscow players
FC Spartak Moscow players
FC Spartak-2 Moscow players
FC Rotor Volgograd players
FC Urozhay Krasnodar players
Russian Premier League players
Russian First League players
Russian Second League players